The Gabilan Mountains slender salamander (Batrachoseps gavilanensis) is a species of salamander in the family Plethodontidae. It is endemic to California in the United States, where it is distributed along the Central Coast region from Santa Cruz to northern Kern County.

This salamander lives in redwood and evergreen forests, chaparral, and California oak woodland habitat. It burrows in soil and forest litter.

This species is up to 16.5 centimeters long, including its long tail. It is gray with brown and black washes, white speckling along the sides, and usually a brownish dorsal stripe bordered with black dots.

This species and several other native California salamanders were described as new species in 2001 when the Batrachoseps pacificus species complex was split according to the results of a phylogenetic analysis.

References

Slender salamanders
Salamander
Salamander
Fauna of the California chaparral and woodlands
Gabilan Range
Natural history of the California Coast Ranges
Natural history of San Benito County, California
Amphibians described in 2001
Taxonomy articles created by Polbot